

This is a list of the National Register of Historic Places listings in Kenosha County, Wisconsin.

This is intended to be a complete list of the properties and districts on the National Register of Historic Places in Kenosha County, Wisconsin, United States. Latitude and longitude coordinates are provided for many National Register properties and districts; these locations may be seen together in a map.

There are 29 properties and districts listed on the National Register in the county.  Another two properties were once listed but have been removed.

Current listings

|}

Former listings

|}

See also
 
 List of National Historic Landmarks in Wisconsin
 National Register of Historic Places listings in Wisconsin
 Listings in neighboring counties: Lake (IL), McHenry (IL), Racine, Walworth

References

 
Kenosha County